William H. Abington (January 2, 1871 – March 19, 1951) was an American politician. He was a member of the Arkansas House of Representatives, representing White County, Arkansas, and Arkansas State Senate as a member of the Democratic party. He also represented the 27th District, which comprises White County and Faulkner County, Arkansas.

He was a Major, Commanding Officer and surgeon of the 1st Arkansas Infantry Regiment and reported to Alexandria, Louisiana to go to Camp Beauregard. He was also a member of the National Guard. He also taught at the College of Physicians and Surgeons (now University of Arkansas for Medical Sciences [UAMS]). In 1927, he was also involved in the controversial debate of state-funded schools and two new additions to that list. In 1943, he sponsored the Senate Bill No. 65 known as the Anti-Violence Law which received criticism.

He died in 1951 and was buried at Beebe Cemetery in White County, Arkansas. His childhood home is listed on the National Register of Historic Places.

See also
 48th Arkansas General Assembly

References

1951 deaths
1871 births
Politicians from Sebastian County, Arkansas
People from Prairie County, Arkansas
Military personnel from Arkansas
Democratic Party Arkansas state senators
Speakers of the Arkansas House of Representatives
Democratic Party members of the Arkansas House of Representatives